Jawan Bakht may refer to:
Mirza Jawan Bakht (born 1749), Mughal prince
Mirza Jawan Bakht (born 1841), Mughal prince
Hashim Jawan Bakht (born 1979), Pakistani politician who is the current Provincial Minister of Punjab for finance